The Minister for Land Information is a minister in the government of New Zealand. The minister has responsibility for matters relating to land titles, ratings, survey systems, topographical and hygrographical information and Crown Property Management. It was split from the Lands portfolio in 1987.

The current minister is Damien O'Connor.

List of Ministers
Key

References

Land Information
Public office-holders in New Zealand
Land Information